Phillip Knight is a former Australian rules footballer, who played for the Fitzroy Football Club in the Victorian Football League (VFL).

Career
Knight played for Fitzroy from the 1985 season to the 1988 season.

References

External links

1963 births
Living people
Fitzroy Football Club players
Melbourne High School Old Boys Football Club players
Australian rules footballers from Victoria (Australia)